Anzor Sitchinava (born 8 September 1995) is a Georgian rugby union player. His position is wing, and he currently plays for Academy Tbilisi in the Didi 10 and the Georgia national team.

Sitchinava received a yellow card for tackling a player in the air in his first international match against Japan in 2016. He was selected as part of the 36-man Georgian squad to prepare for the 2018 Rugby Europe Championship.

References

1995 births
Living people
Rugby union players from Georgia (country)
Georgia international rugby union players
Batumi RC players
Rugby union wings